AZG or Azg may refer to:
 Azg (daily), a newspaper in Yerevan, Armenia
 Aluminium zirconium tetrachlorohydrex gly
 San Pedro Amuzgo language
 Silk Way West Airlines, an Azerbaijani cargo airline
 AZA-GUANINE RESISTANT, a transporter of purines